The fourth series of the British historical drama television series Downton Abbey broadcast from 22 September 2013 to 10 November 2013, comprising a total of eight episodes and one Christmas Special episode broadcast on 25 December 2013. The series was broadcast on ITV in the United Kingdom and on PBS in the United States, which supported the production as part of its Masterpiece Classic anthology.

Series overview
Cora hires Edna Braithwaite to replace O'Brien, who has resigned. Things though do not work out and Braithwaite is replaced by Phyllis Baxter.

Lady Mary mourns Matthew's death. Matthew's newly-found letter states Mary is to be his sole heir and thus gives her management over his share of the estate until their son, George, comes of age. Mary assumes a more active role in running Downton. Two new suitors—Lord Gillingham and Charles Blake—arrive at Downton, though Mary, still grieving, appears not to be interested. Lady Edith, who has begun writing a weekly newspaper column and Michael Gregson, a magazine editor, fall in love. Due to English law, he is unable to divorce his wife, who is mentally ill and in an asylum. Gregson travels to Germany to seek citizenship there, enabling him to divorce, but is killed by Hitler's Brownshirts during riots. Edith is pregnant and secretly gives birth to a daughter whilst in Switzerland. She places the baby with a couple there, but later reclaims her daughter after arranging for a family on the Downton estate (Mr and Mrs Drewe of Yew Tree Farm), to foster her.

Anna is raped by Lord Gillingham's valet, Mr Green, which Mr Bates later discovers. Subsequently, Mr Green is killed in a London street accident. A local school teacher, Sarah Bunting, and Tom begin a friendship. Sampson, a card sharp and previous guest at Downton, steals a letter written by the Prince of Wales to his mistress, Rose's friend Freda Dudley Ward, which, if made public, would create a scandal; the Crawley family connives to retrieve it.

Cast and characters

Main cast

Upstairs
Hugh Bonneville as Robert Crawley, Earl of Grantham
Laura Carmichael as Lady Edith Crawley
Michelle Dockery as Lady Mary Crawley
Elizabeth McGovern as Cora Crawley, Countess of Grantham
Maggie Smith as Violet Crawley, Dowager Countess of Grantham
Penelope Wilton as Mrs Isobel Crawley

Downstairs
Jim Carter as Mr Charles Carson; the Butler
Phyllis Logan as Mrs Elsie Hughes; the Housekeeper
Brendan Coyle as Mr John Bates; Lord Grantham's valet
Joanne Froggatt as Miss Anna Smith; head housemaid
Lesley Nicol as Mrs Beryl Patmore; the cook
Sophie McShera as Daisy Robinson; a kitchen maid

Episodes

External links
 

Downton Abbey series